Jacques Sirmond (12 or 22 October 1559 – 7 October 1651) was a French scholar and Jesuit.

Simond was born at Riom, Auvergne. He was educated at the Jesuit College of Billom; having been a novice at Verdun and then at Pont-Mousson, he entered into the order on 26 July 1576. After having taught rhetoric at Paris he resided for a long time in Rome as secretary to Claudio Acquaviva (1590–1608). In 1637 he was confessor to Louis XIII.

Works
He brought out many editions of Latin and Byzantine chroniclers of the Middle Ages:
Ennodius and Flodoard (1611)
Sidonius Apollinaris (1614)
the life of St Leo IX by the archdeacon Wibert (1615)
Marcellinus and Idatius (1619)
Anastasius the Librarian (1620)
Eusebius of Caesarea (1643)
Hincmar (1645)
Theodulf of Orléans (1646)
Hrabanus Maurus (1647)
Rufinus and Loup de Ferrières (1650)
his edition of the capitularies of Charles the Bald (Karoli Calvi et successorum aliquot Franciae regum capitula, 1623)
edition of the councils of ancient France (Concilia antiquae Galliae, 1629, 3 vols., new ed. incomplete, 1789).

An essay in which he denied the identity of St Denis of Paris and St Denis the Areopagite (1641), caused a controversy. His Opera varia, where this essay is to be found, as well as a description in Latin verse of his voyage from Paris to Rome in 1590, have appeared in 5 vols (1696; new ed. Venice, 1728). To him is attributed Elogio di cardinale Baronio (1607).

References

External links

1559 births
1651 deaths
People from Riom
16th-century French Jesuits
17th-century French Jesuits
Lycée Louis-le-Grand teachers